Lloyd Daley also known as Lloyd's the Matador (born 12 July 1939, Kingston, Jamaica, died 18 March 2018, Florida, USA) was a Jamaican electronic technician, sound system pioneer, studio engineer and reggae producer.

Career
Daley had success in the early reggae period on his Matador label with artists like Jackie Mittoo ("Dark of the Sun") or The Scorchers ("Ugly Man").

His biggest hit came out in 1969 with Little Roy and his rasta song "Bongo Nyah" which became a long-time Jamaican number one. He then produced other popular singles for artists like The Abyssinians ("Yim Mas Gan") recorded 1969, The Ethiopians ("Owe Me No Pay Me"), Dennis Brown ("Things in Life")and ("Baby Don't do it"), The Wailing Souls ("Gold Digger"), the first recordings of The Gladiators ("Freedom Train", "Rockaman Soul"), Alton Ellis ("Back to Africa" and "Lord Deliver Us"  another Jamaican hit), John Holt or The Paragons. In the book Reggae, The Rough Guide, Steve Barrow commented that the releases "...superbly demonstrate how Jamaica's musical heritage should be presented".

He also released many instrumental tunes with Johnnie Moore or Lloyd Charmers ("Zylon" was a 1969 hit) and dee-jay versions of his hits with artists like U-Roy ("Sound of the Wise" and "Scandal", both recorded in October 1969). In 1971, Daley released Little Roy's "Hard Fighter" version, recorded by The Hippy Boys, and named "Voo-doo". It was one of the first instrumental dub tunes where drum and the bass had a dominating role.

Discography

Compilation albums

Various Artists – Scandal – Matador – LP
Various Artists – Way Back When – Matador (1979) – LP
Various Artists – Lloyd Daley's Matador Productions 1968–1972: Reggae Classics from the Originator – Heartbeat (1992)
Various Artists – From Matador's Arena Vol 01: 1968–1969 – Jamaican Gold (1994)
Various Artists – From Matador's Arena Vol 02: 1969–1970 – Jamaican Gold (1994)
Various Artists – From Matador's Arena Vol 03: 1971–1979 – Jamaican Gold (1994)
Various Artists – Shuffle 'n Ska Time With Lloyd 1960–1966 – Jamaican Gold (1995)

See also
List of Jamaican backing bands
List of Jamaican record producers

References

External links
[ Lloyd Daley biography] at AllMusic website

1939 births
Living people
Musicians from Kingston, Jamaica
Jamaican record producers
Jamaican sound systems